Aappilattoq is a settlement in the Avannaata municipality in northwestern Greenland, located on an island of the same name in the southern part of Upernavik Archipelago. Founded in 1805, the settlement had 149 inhabitants in 2020.

Upernavik Archipelago 

Aappilattoq is located within Upernavik Archipelago, a vast archipelago of small islands on the coast of northeastern Baffin Bay.

Transport 
During weekdays Air Greenland serves the village as part of government contract, with mostly cargo helicopter flights between Aappilattoq Heliport and Upernavik Airport.

Population 
The population of Aappilattoq has increased in the 1990s. It has been however steadily decreasing since.

References 

Populated places in Greenland
Populated places of Arctic Greenland
Upernavik Archipelago
1805 establishments in Greenland